Fulvio Bernardini (28 December 1905 – 13 January 1984) was an Italian football player and coach, who played as a midfielder. He is regarded as one of Italy's greatest ever footballers and managers.

Club career
During his playing career, Bernardini played for Lazio, Inter, Roma and M.A.T.E.R. at club level.

International career
At international level, Bernardini was also a member of the Italy national football team that won the bronze medal in the football tournament at the 1928 Summer Olympics.

Managerial career
Following his playing career, Bernardini worked as a manager, and coached Roma, Vicenza, Fiorentina (winning the Italian championship during the 1955–56 Serie A season), Lazio (winning the Coppa Italia during the 1957–58 season), Bologna (winning the Italian championship during the 1963–64 Serie A season), Sampdoria, and Brescia, before going on to coach the Italy national team from 1974 to 1975.

Personal life
Bernardini was born and died in Rome.

He is one of the members of the A.S. Roma Hall of Fame.

Honours

Player
Italy
 Summer Olympics: Bronze 1928
 Central European International Cup: 1927-30
 Central European International Cup: Runner-up: 1931-32

Manager
Fiorentina
Serie A: 1955–56

Lazio
Coppa Italia: 1957–58

Bologna
Serie A: 1963–64

Individual
 Capocannoniere: 1922–23 (21 goals),
Seminatore d'Oro: 1955–56
Italian Football Hall of Fame: 2011
A.S. Roma Hall of Fame: 2012
ACF Fiorentina Hall of Fame: 2012

Notes

References

External links
 

1905 births
1984 deaths
Italian footballers
Italy international footballers
Italian football managers
Italy national football team managers
Olympic footballers of Italy
Footballers at the 1928 Summer Olympics
Olympic bronze medalists for Italy
Serie A players
Serie B players
Inter Milan players
A.S. Roma players
S.S. Lazio players
Maccabi Netanya F.C. players
A.S. Roma managers
L.R. Vicenza managers
ACF Fiorentina managers
S.S. Lazio managers
Bologna F.C. 1909 managers
U.C. Sampdoria managers
Brescia Calcio managers
Olympic medalists in football
Medalists at the 1928 Summer Olympics
Association football midfielders
Burials at the Cimitero Flaminio